Yang Kyung-won (born 1981) is a South Korean actor and model. He is best known for his roles in Vincenzo, Crash Landing on You, Arthdal Chronicles Part 1: The Children of Prophecy and Hi Bye, Mama!.

Filmography

Television series

Web series

Film

Awards and nominations

References

External links 
 
 

1981 births
Living people
People from Seoul
Male actors from Seoul
Models from Seoul
21st-century South Korean male actors
South Korean male models
South Korean male television actors
South Korean male film actors